The Bacalaureat (or bac for short) is an exam held in Romania when one graduates high school.

Romania

History
The Romanian Baccalaureate has evolved over time.

Present
Unlike the French Baccalaureate, the Romanian one has a single degree. The subjects (except subject A) depend on the profile studied: mathematics and computer science, philology, natural sciences, social sciences, or various other vocational tracks, and the candidate's choice.

The exam covers the whole high school curriculum and the marking scale is between 1 and 10. In order to pass, students must obtain at least 5.00 in every subject with a minimum of 6.00 overall. All the graduates in the country take the exam at the same time. The subjects vary from profile to profile.

Subjects

The baccalaureate has up to 5 modules, each one graded separately. Module E, the written examination, is the one considered for admission to higher education.

Competence exams

A, B and D are marked with: Beginner, Average, Advanced and Experienced.
 A: Romanian language - oral examination.
 B: Maternal Language - if different from Romanian, and if studied; oral examination.
 C: foreign language - oral and written examination; graded on the CEFR scale, from A1 to B2.
 D: computer skills.

Written exams

Each exam takes three hours.
 E)a): Romanian Language and Literature.
 E)b): Maternal Language and Literature - if different from Romanian, and if studied.
 E)c): compulsory subject (of the profile).
 E)d): subject to be chosen (of the profile).

References
 www.edu.ro
 Legislation

School examinations
School qualifications
Education in Romania